Rise of the Tyrant is the seventh studio album by Swedish melodic death metal band Arch Enemy. It was produced by Fredrik Nordström and released on 24 September 2007 via Century Media.

Background
Vocalist Angela Gossow commented on Rise of the Tyrant on the band's website that: 

Guitarist Michael Amott described it as: 

Rise of the Tyrant debuted at number 84 on the Billboard 200, selling around 8,900 copies. This surpasses Doomsday Machine, making it the band's highest-charting effort yet.

Music videos were made for the songs "Revolution Begins" and "I Will Live Again", both directed by Patric Ullaeus.

Track listing

Limited edition
Also available is a limited edition version including a bonus 3" DVD with two live tracks and a documentary on the band's tour of South America.

Bonus DVD
South American Doomsday 2007:
 "I Am Legend / Out for Blood (live)" – 5:25
 "Diva Satanica (live)" – 4:29
 "Arch Enemy - South American Tour" − 16:07 (includes backstage footage, fan meeting, etc.)

Singles
 "Blood on Your Hands"
 "Revolution Begins"
 "I Will Live Again"

Charts

Personnel
Arch Enemy
 Angela Gossow − vocals
 Michael Amott − guitars, keyboards
 Christopher Amott − guitars
 Sharlee D'Angelo − bass
 Daniel Erlandsson − drums

Production
 Produced by Fredrik Nordström and Michael Amott; co-produced by Daniel Erlandsson
 Mixed by Fredrik Nordström
 Engineered by Patrik J. Sten
 Mastered by Peter In De Betou
 All music arranged by Michael Amott and Daniel Erlandsson. Drum arrangements by Daniel Erlandsson. Vocal arrangements by Angela Gossow. Additional arrangements by Arch Enemy.
 Keyboards by Per Wiberg (not credited in album artwork)
 Artwork by Niklas Sundin

Release history

References

External links
 Rise of the Tyrant at Encyclopaedia Metallum

2007 albums
Arch Enemy albums
Albums produced by Fredrik Nordström
Albums recorded at Studio Fredman
Century Media Records albums